"Come On to Me" is a song by English musician Paul McCartney, released by Capitol Records on 20 June 2018 as a double A-side single alongside "I Don't Know", both taken from McCartney's 17th studio album Egypt Station.

"Come On to Me" is described on McCartney's web site as a "raucous stomper that fans that first spark of chemistry into a rocking blaze". The song peaked at No. 10 on Billboards Adult Contemporary Songs chart, McCartney's first top 10 appearance since 1993.

Composition and recording
In the Words Between Tracks episode about writing a song, McCartney said:

The track was recorded at Henson Studios in Los Angeles, with additional sessions recorded at Hog Hill Mill in Sussex and Abbey Road Studios. It was engineered by Steve Orchard, Alex Pasco, Julian Burg, and Greg Kurstin.

Release 
"Come On to Me" was released on 20 June 2018. The official Paul McCartney website announced on 11 October 2018 that the exclusive version of the double A-side single would be released as part of Record Store Day. The hand-numbered vinyl was limited to 5,000 copies and was available at independent record stores around the world on 23 November 2018. As of August 2021, the song has over fifteen million streams on Spotify.

Live performances
McCartney's first live performance of "Come On to Me" took place during a surprise show at the Philharmonic Dining Rooms in his native Liverpool on 9 June 2018, which was filmed as part of his "Carpool Karaoke" segment for The Late Late Show with James Corden.

McCartney performed "Come On to Me" live at most of his 2018 Secret Gigs tour. The only concert of the impromptu tour where "Come On to Me" wasn't included in the setlist was a gig at the Liverpool Institute for Performing Arts. On the eve of Egypt Station release, McCartney performed the song live on The Tonight Show with Jimmy Fallon. The song was also included in the setlist of his Freshen Up tour.

Personnel
 Paul McCartney – lead and backing vocals, electric and acoustic guitars, keyboards, percussion, harmonica
 Paul "Wix" Wickens – keyboards
 Rusty Anderson – electric guitar
 Brian Ray – electric guitar, bass guitar
 Abe Laboriel Jr. – drums
 Greg Phillinganes – piano
 Tim Loo – cello
 Greg Kurstin – electric guitar, percussion
 Muscle Shoals Rhythm Section – horns

Charts

Weekly charts

Year-end charts

References

2018 singles
2018 songs
Paul McCartney songs
Capitol Records singles
Song recordings produced by Greg Kurstin
Songs written by Paul McCartney